Telford railway station was located on the Central Australia Railway, and later the Marree railway line serving the small South Australian outback mining town of Leigh Creek.

History
The Telford railway station was opened between 1881 and 1882 during the construction of the railway from Port Augusta to Government Gums (now Farina).  It was located north of Leigh Creek railway station (later known as Copley railway station). In 1888, coal-bearing shale was found in the area during the creation of a railway dam, but large-scale operations on the coal mine did not begin until 1943 when coal shortages caused by WWII prompted the State Government to begin mining coal to power coal-fired power stations in the state so the state would be self-sufficient in generating electricity.  The town of Leigh Creek was built next to Telford railway station to support the coal mine, but the station's name was not changed to Leigh Creek, despite the original Leigh Creek station being renamed to Copley in 1916 because of the Copley township being built next to it. The mine became known as Telford Cut, and the deposit next to Leigh Creek was known as Lobe B. 
The narrow-gauge railway south from Leigh Creek was under pressure from coal trains, with the coal trains getting heavier as time went on. A solution was needed to help increase capacity for the coal trains, with multiple options being identified for a standard gauge railway. These included upgrading the existing line to Leigh Creek, or making a new railway that ran to the west of the Flinders Ranges, bypassing the Pichi Richi Pass. It was eventually chosen to build the new railway, and it opened to Leigh Creek in 1956 and Marree in 1957. From then on, the original narrow-gauge alignment was progressively abandoned, with the Port Augusta to Hawker alignment finally being closed in 1972.
As part of the new standard-gauge railway, a new Telford railway station was built. There was also a balloon loop built at Lobe D, one of the 2 coal mines opened slightly north of the existing Lobe B mine in 1948 along with Lobe C, which was built on the original NG alignment. Mining at the northernmost sites, Lobe C and Lobe D continued until 1977, when mining was moved back to Lobe B (Telford Cut) and it was expanded to accommodate for the new Northern Power Station near Port Augusta. This required closing the original Leigh Creek town and building a new one south of the coalfield. The narrow gauge Telford station was demolished, along with the rest of the original Leigh Creek town. The expansion was built through the original NG alignment. A balloon loop was also created at Telford Cut, which eventually became the terminus of the standard gauge Marree railway line on the 10th of June, 1987. The balloon loop was south of Telford station. Eventually, the line north of the balloon loop was removed in 1993.
The coalfield's only customers, the coal-fired power stations near Port Augusta closed in 2016. Mining at the coalfields ceased in 2015, though trains continued to transport the remainder of the coal until 2016.

Present Day
Today, the narrow gauge station has been completely demolished, though the standard gauge goods platform and the foundations of the station building survive. The line from Stirling North to Telford Cut remains intact, and Alinta Energy handed the line back to the state government in 2018.

References

External links
Gallery of the old Leigh Creek town

Disused railway stations in South Australia
Railway stations in Australia opened in 1882
Railway stations closed in 1987
Far North (South Australia)